WXNC (1060 kHz) is a commercial AM radio station in Monroe, North Carolina, serving the Charlotte metropolitan area.  It broadcasts a Spanish language adult contemporary radio format, originating on WGSP 1310 AM.  It is owned by the Norsan Group.

WXNC is a daytimer station.  By day, WXNC is powered at 4,000 watts, using a non-directional antenna.  But because AM 1060 is a clear channel frequency reserved for Class A KYW Philadelphia and XEEP Mexico City, WXNC must sign off at night to avoid interference.  During critical hours, it is powered at 2,400 watts.  Programming is heard around the clock on FM translator W247CV at 97.3 MHz.

History
In July 1947, the station first signed on the air as WMAP.  It was a 1,000-watt station in Monroe, North Carolina.  WMAP added an FM sister station at 102.3.  The FM station was later sold off, although today it is co-owned again and is WGSP-FM.

WXNC went dark in 1995. After a two-year absence, it came back as WKRE in March 1997.  The studios were later moved to Charlotte.  The signal was increased to 5,000 watts.

As a Charlotte-based station, WXNC had a talk radio format known as The Conversation Station. The announcement was made that WXNC would also be heard on WKMT at 1220 AM, also owned by Kevin and Kris Geddings.

Later, the Norsan Group, which already owned 1310 WGSP, bought WXNC, which soon changed to a Spanish language format and began its simulcast of the "La Tremenda" network with WGSP. At one time WGSP-FM (formerly WRML) at 102.3 FM simulcast this station.

References

External links
Station Website 

XNC
Regional Mexican radio stations in the United States
XNC
Radio stations established in 1947
1947 establishments in North Carolina
XNC